Amy Robinson (born April 13, 1948) is an American actress and film producer.

Biography
Robinson got her first film role as an actress as the female lead in Martin Scorsese's breakthrough hit Mean Streets and eventually produced his film After Hours.  She was a member of the dramatic jury at the Sundance Film Festival in 1987.

In 1986, both Griffin Dunne and Amy Robinson, via Double Play Productions had signed a deal with Metro-Goldwyn-Mayer for a two-year agreement to develop motion pictures.

Filmography as a producer
Head Over Heels (1979) (renamed Chilly Scenes of Winter when re-released in 1981)
Baby It's You (1983)
After Hours (1985)
Running on Empty (1988)
White Palace (1990)
Once Around (1991)
With Honors (1994)
For Love of the Game (1999)
Drive Me Crazy (1999)
Autumn in New York (2000)
From Hell (2001)
When Zachary Beaver Came to Town (2003)
Marie and Bruce (2004)
Game 6 (2005)
The Great New Wonderful (2005)
12 and Holding (2005)
Julie & Julia (2009)

Filmography as an actress
A Brand New Life (1973, TV movie) - Nancy
Mean Streets (1973) - Teresa
Get Christie Love! (1974, TV series) - Sally
The Neighborhood (1982, TV movie) - Mrs. Kilgore
Casualty (1988, TV series) - Julie (final television appearance)

References

External links
 
 

1948 births
Actresses from New Jersey
American film actresses
Film producers from New Jersey
Living people
Actors from Trenton, New Jersey
Sarah Lawrence College alumni
20th-century American actresses
American women film producers
21st-century American women